The 2019 AIBA Women's World Boxing Championships were held in Ulan-Ude, Russia from 3 to 13 October 2019.

Medal summary

Medal table

Medal events

References

External links
AIBA website
AIBA on Facebook
Results book

 
2019
Aiba
AIBA Women's World Boxing Championships
International boxing competitions hosted by Russia
Sport in Ulan-Ude
AIBA Women's World Boxing Championships